Atelographus susanae is a species of longhorn beetles of the subfamily Lamiinae. It was described by Monné in 1975, and is known from southeastern Brazil and northern Argentina.

References

Beetles described in 1975
Beetles of South America
Acanthocinini